Liolaemus hajeki, Hajek's lizard, is a species of lizard in the family  Liolaemidae. It is native to Chile.

References

hajeki
Reptiles described in 2004
Reptiles of Chile
Endemic fauna of Chile